Joseph or Joe Potter may refer to:

 Joseph H. Potter (1822–1892), general in the Union Army during the American Civil War
 Joseph Potter (architect) (1756–1842), English architect and builder
 William Everett Potter (1905–1988), known as Joe, U.S. Army general, Governor of the Panama Canal Zone and Disney Legend
 Joseph E. Potter, American sociologist
 Joseph Potter (cricketer) (1839–1906), English cricketer
 Joe Potter (curler), see Ontario Curling Association

See also
 Joey Potter, female fictional character in Dawson's Creek
 Jo Potter (born 1984), female footballer
 Joe Potter, a character from the Black Mirror television episode White Christmas